Epilepsy is a disorder in which nerve cell activity in the brain is disturbed, causing seizures. During a seizure, a person experiences abnormal behavior, symptoms, and sensations, sometimes including loss of consciousness. There are few symptoms between seizures. A seizure is a single occurrence, whereas epilepsy is a neurological condition characterized by two or more unprovoked seizures (Johns Hopkins Medicine). Epilepsy is the most common childhood brain disorder in the United States. Nearly 3 million people have been diagnosed with this disease, while 450,000 of them are under the age of 17. Two thirds of the child population will overcome the side effects, including seizures, through treatment during adolescence. Some treatments include surgery, medication and therapy, surgery however is only done if the child has drug resistant epilepsy (Rekha Dwivedi, Ph.D. et al.).

A doctor will most often diagnose a child with epilepsy, also known as seizure disorder, if the child has one or more seizures, if the doctor thinks they could have another one, and if their seizures aren't caused by another medical condition.

Some forms of epilepsy end after childhood. There are four main types of epilepsy: focal, generalized, combination focal and generalized, and unknown. A doctor generally diagnoses someone with epilepsy if they have had two or more unprovoked seizures (Medical News Today). Approximately 70% of children who have epilepsy during their childhood outgrow it. There are also some seizures, such as febrile seizures, that are one-time occurrences during childhood, and do not result in permanent epilepsy.

Pediatric epilepsy may cause changes in the development of the brain. Even when seizures are well controlled, epilepsy may present a host of other issues that can impact a child's development and ability to function normally. Cognitive impairments that affect language, memory, attention, and other abilities critical to normal development are common among people with epilepsy (Mass General).

Presentation
Diagnosis

In 2014 the International League Against Epilepsy (ILAE) Task Force proposed the operational (practical) clinical definition of epilepsy, intended as a disease of the brain defined by any of the following conditions:

 At least two unprovoked (or reflex) seizures occurring >24 h apart.
 One unprovoked (or reflex) seizure and a probability of further seizures similar to the general recurrence risk (at least 60%) after two unprovoked seizures, occurring over the next 10 years.
 Diagnosis of an epilepsy syndrome.

It is important that as soon as someone is diagnosed with SE, they immediately get medical treatment which is primarily medication.The main test to diagnosis is an Electroencephalogram (EEG), this test is usually performed when the patient is sleep deprived. In this test, electrodes are attached to your scalp with a paste-like substance or cap. The electrodes record the electrical activity of your brain, the results are then read by a Doctor. Accurate diagnosis of your seizure type and where seizures begin is so important because it gives you the best chance for finding an effective treatment (Mayo clinic). diagnosis of Epilepsy and a Seizure disorder can eventually be considered resolved if the subject has not experienced a seizure in over 10 years and has also not been on anti-seizure medication for five years.

The most common causes of SE in children are fever and infections of the CNS, or Central Nervous System. Other causes can be genetic and metabolic disorders, abnormalities of the CNS, ingestion of toxic elements, and Hyponatremia.

Education
Epilepsy can affect the education of children, which can cause difficulty to learning resulting in lower grades. While many children are capable of functioning in a normal classroom environment, many end up in special education programs to ensure they are getting the educational support they need. Children with epilepsy may be absent from school due to their diagnosis.

There are two main types of seizures Tonic-clonic seizures and absence seizures.

Tonic-clonic seizures can have a serious impact on education due to the memory loss they cause, and the time needed to recover following the seizure-causing there to be missed time in school.

Absence seizures can have a high negative impact on a child's education. As they are less obvious than tonic-clonic seizures, they can occur many times within a single day, thereby resulting in the child's ability to learn being impaired, and leading to low grades. Often, these educational deficits lead to the investigation of neurological conditions and result in the diagnosis of this seizure subtype. Children may appear to be 'zoning out' or day-dreaming during classes when in actuality they are experiencing uncontrolled absent seizures. Once treatment begins, these children often exhibit improved attention and their grades improve (Johns Hopkins).

When seizures are controlled by medication, many anticonvulsants have side effects that include drowsiness, thereby also impacting a child's education (Johns Hopkins).

The high school graduation rate[where?] has been reported at 64%, compared with an overall national average of 82%.

Social
It is very difficult for a child to struggle through the constraints of epilepsy. They cannot live the same carefree life that they may watch their friends living, but that does not mean their quality of life is any less. The diagnosis of SE is not a fatal or life-ending one, especially for a child. A child with Epilepsy must be much more wary of their surroundings at all time as well as being in communication with their own physical well-being. The social stigma of epilepsy may stand in the way, as the child is more prone to bullying. But as the child learns to manage the diagnosis, it may become a more conventionally normal life for them.

Many children with epilepsy are overprotected by their parents, who put restrictions on them in the name of safety, requiring more adult supervision than other children, and not allowing them to participate in certain activities normal to the age group, such as sports. It is a subject of debate if a child with controlled seizures needs additional protection or restrictions, or if the benefits outweigh the losses a child would face.

Language 
In cases of chronic pediatric epilepsy there is often an association with reduced language skills. The classically understood language areas of the brain are Broca's area and Wernicke's area. Realistically, language is significantly more complex and involves several cortical areas beyond these regions.

Language deficits may present with a wide variety of symptoms ranging from odd patterns of speech to complete aphasia of speech. Unfortunately there is not a significant amount of data that parses out how an epileptic firing patterns will cause a resulting language deficit. The correlation of epileptic activity and language deficit is undeniably present, but the mechanisms involved have yet to be unraveled.

In the developing brain, epilepsy may cause the language areas to be structurally altered leading to developmental difficulties. In turn, a child may have trouble acquiring communication skills at a normal rate. This delay may in some children be resolved by compensatory mechanisms or alleviated by medication and therapy, but in some children with persistent epilepsy, the delay may remain or worsen as they age.

In the case of temporal lobe epilepsy (TLE), studies have shown that there is structural compromise to the fiber tracts associated with memory and language, providing some explanation for the impairments in patients with epilepsy.

Language abilities in pediatric epilepsy cases are evaluated using electrical cortical stimulation (ECS) language mapping, electrocorticography (ECoG), fMRI, Wada testing, and magnetoencephalography (MEG).

fMRI has been shown to offer a promising strategy for defining language activation patterns as well as laterization patterns.

It is important to identify language regions involved in epilepsy, particularly temporal lobe epilepsy, before surgical resection in order to reduce the risk of postoperative language deficits.  Currently, ECS mapping is the standard of care in localization of areas involved in focal seizure onset and pre surgical planning.

Many pediatric and adult epilepsy patients develop atypical language lateralization due to the reorganization of connections in the epileptic brain. There have been documented cases of interhemispheric and intrahemispheric reorganization of language areas. Several factors may be involved in the extent to which reorganization occurs.

"Table 1: Variables Associated With Interhemispheric and Intrahemispheric Reorganization Found in fMRI and ECS Studies."

The effects of epilepsy on language may be impacted by location of epileptiform activity, severity and duration of electrical discharges, age of onset, treatment method, and surgical resection areas.

In some cases, language impairment may be the first indicator of epileptiform activity in the brain of children. A study done at the University of Gothenburg showed that language impairments were more common in children with epileptic brain activity than children without.
 They then investigated whether the epileptic activity was the cause of the language deficit or whether there were other factors involved. They found the greatest impairments in language in the children with misfiring on the left side of the brain, the side that controls linguistic abilities. This likely indicates that epileptic activity leads to language difficulties and suggests that in children with language impairments of unknown etiology, evaluations for epilepsy should be considered.

Causes and symptoms 
The causes of epilepsy in childhood vary.
 Unknown 67.6%
 Congenital 20%
 Trauma 4.7%
 Infection 4%
 Stroke 1.5%
 Tumor 1.5%
 Degenerative .7%

Some of the known causes include: an imbalance of nerve-signaling brain chemicals (neurotransmitters), brain tumors, stroke, brain damage from illness or injury. However, a seizure may be caused by a combination of these. In most cases, the cause of a seizure can not be found (Hopkins medicine).

There are many different symptoms to look for in epilepsy in children.

Your child's symptoms depend on the type of seizure. General symptoms or warning signs of a seizure can include:
 Staring
 Jerking movements of the arms and legs
 Stiffening of the body
 Loss of consciousness
 Breathing problems or stopping breathing
 Loss of bowel or bladder control
 Falling suddenly for no apparent reason, especially when associated with loss of consciousness
 Not responding to noise or words for brief periods
 Appearing confused or in a haze
 Nodding head rhythmically, when associated with loss of awareness or consciousness
 Periods of rapid eye blinking and staring

During the seizure, your child's lips may become tinted blue and his or her breathing may not be normal. After the seizure, your child may be sleepy or confused. It is important to note if you child returns to baseline or not after the seizure occurs.

The symptoms of a seizure may be like those of other health conditions. Make sure your child sees his or her healthcare provider for a diagnosis(Hopkins Medicine).

The symptoms can also vary depending on the type of seizures that one has.  Focal seizures, which are seizures that start on one side of the brain but can spread across the brain, and could potentially cause numbness, tingling, or a feeling that something is crawling on your skin.  Generalized seizures are  seizures that occur when the abnormal electrical activity causing a seizure begins in both halves of the brain at the same time, this could lead to loss of consciousness, shaking, stiffening, and spasms.

Treatment
Most children who develop epilepsy are treated conventionally with anticonvulsants. In about 70% of cases of childhood epilepsy, medication can completely control seizures. Unfortunately, medications come with an extensive list of side effects that range from mild discomfort to major cognitive impairment. Usually, the adverse cognitive effects are ablated following dose reduction or cessation of the drug.

Medicating a child is not always easy. Many pills are made only to be swallowed, which can be difficult for a child. For some medications, chewable versions do exist.

The goal of treatment is to control, stop, or reduce how often seizures occur. Treatment is most often done with medicine. Many types of medicines used to treat seizures and epilepsy. Your child's healthcare provider will need to identify the type of seizure your child is having. Medicines are selected based on the type of seizure, age of the child, side effects, cost, and ease of use. Medicines used at home are usually taken by mouth as capsules, tablets, sprinkles, or syrup. Some medicines can be given into the rectum or in the nose. If your child is in the hospital with seizures, medicine may be given by injection or intravenously by vein (IV) (Hopkins Medicine).  Medications such as: stimulants, antidepressants, and antipsychotics have shown to lower seizure threshold and can increase neuro stability.  Three-fourths of children that take medication see improvement and controlled seizures after 2-3 years of taking that medication.

It is important to give your child medicine on time and as prescribed. The dose may need to be adjusted for the best seizure control. All medicines can have side effects. Talk with your child's healthcare provider about possible side effects. If your child has side effects, talk to the healthcare provider. Do not stop giving medicine to your child. This can cause more or worse seizures (Hopkins Medicine).

Although there are many medications to help prevent seizures, there are still more than 30% of the 70 million people that have drug resistant seizures throughout their life.  There are 20% of children that have shown to be pharmacoresistance to trials of multiple antiepileptic drugs.  This could be caused by inadequate or incorrect doses of medicine

While your child is taking medicine, he or she may need tests to see how well the medicine is working. You may have:
 Blood tests. Your child may need blood tests often to check the level of medicine in his or her body. Based on this level, the healthcare provider may change the dose of medicine. Your child may also have blood tests to check the effects of the medicine on his or her other organs.
 Urine tests. Your child's urine may be tested to see how his or her body is reacting to the medicine.
 Electroencephalogram (EEG). An EEG is a procedure that records the brain's electrical activity. This is done by attaching electrodes to the scalp. This test is done to see how medicine is helping the electrical problems in your child's brain.

Your child may not need medicine for life. Some children are taken off medicine if they have had no seizures for 1 to 2 years. This will be determined by your child's healthcare provider (Hopkins Medicine).

The ketogenic diet is used to treat children who have not responded successfully to other treatments. This diet is low in carbohydrates, adequate in protein and high in fat. It has proven successful in two thirds of epilepsy cases.

A ketogenic diet is a type of diet is very high in fat, and very low in carbohydrates. Enough protein is included to help promote growth. The diet causes the body to make ketones. These are chemicals made from the breakdown of body fat. The brain and heart work normally with ketones as an energy source. This special diet must be strictly followed. Too many carbohydrates can stop ketosis. Researchers aren't sure why the diet works. But some children become seizure-free when put on the diet. The diet doesn't work for every child (Hopkins Medicine).

Vagus Nerve stimulation (VNS)

This treatment sends small pulses of energy to the brain from one of the vagus nerves. This is a pair of large nerves in the neck. If your child is age 12 or older and has partial seizures that are not controlled well with medicine, VNS may be an option. VNS is done by surgically placing a small battery into the chest wall. Small wires are then attached to the battery and placed under the skin and around one of the vagus nerves. The battery is then programmed to send energy impulses every few minutes to the brain. When your child feels a seizure coming on, he or she may activate the impulses by holding a small magnet over the battery. In many cases, this will help to stop the seizure. VNS can have side effects such as hoarse voice, pain in the throat, or change in voice (Hopkins medicine).

In some cases, severe epilepsy is treated with the hemispherectomy, a drastic surgical procedure in which part or all of one of the hemispheres of the brain is removed.

See also 
 Neonatal seizure

References 

Epilepsy
Neurological disorders in children